Rising Pune Supergiant (RPS) was a franchise cricket team based in Pune, Maharashtra, India, which played in the Indian Premier League (IPL) in 2016 and 2017. It was one of eight teams which competed in the 2017 Indian Premier League. The team was captained for the season by Steve Smith and coached by Stephen Fleming. They lost the final to Mumbai Indians by 1 run in what was to be the team's last match.

Pre-season
 Steve Smith replaced MS Dhoni as the team's captain before the start of the season.
 The franchise changed its name to Rising Pune Supergiant, removing the 's', on 26 March 2017.

Player acquisition

The player auction for the 2017 season was held on 20 February in Bangalore. Rising Pune Supergiant bought the following players at the auction:

Ben Stokes
Jaydev Unadkat
Rahul Chahar
Saurabh Kumar
Milind Tandon
Daniel Christian
Rahul Tripathi
Manoj Tiwary
Lockie Ferguson

The first trading window was open in December 2016 while the second trading window was open from 13 to 20 January 2017. The following transfers were made by Rising Pune Supergiant during the trading windows:

Mayank Agarwal from Delhi Daredevils
Shardul Thakur from Kings XI Punjab

Squad 
 Players with international caps are listed in bold

League stage

Play-offs
Qualifier 1

Final

Statistics

Most Runs

 Source: Cricinfo

Most Wickets

 Source: Cricinfo

References

External links
Official Website

Rising Pune Supergiants seasons
2017 Indian Premier League